Banica is a village in the municipality of Strumica, North Macedonia.

Demographics
As of the 2021 census, Banica had 1,191 residents with the following ethnic composition:
Persons for whom data are taken from administrative sources 750
Macedonians 438
Others 3

According to the 2002 census, the village had a total of 1,137 inhabitants. Ethnic groups in the village include:
Macedonians 1,129
Serbs 2
Bosniaks 1
Others 5

References

Villages in Strumica Municipality